Bathpool may refer to two places in the United Kingdom:
 Bathpool, Cornwall, a village
 Bathpool, Somerset, a hamlet

See also 
 Bathpool Park